"Shut Up and Dance" is a song by American rock band Aerosmith.  Written by Steven Tyler, Joe Perry, Jack Blades, and Tommy Shaw, it first appeared on the band's 1993 album Get a Grip. It was released only in the United Kingdom, reaching number 24 on the UK Singles Chart. It was performed in the 1993 movie Wayne's World 2.  This live version is included on the movie's soundtrack.

Lyrical content
Some of the lyrics are double entendres, such as "sex is like a gun: you aim, you shoot, you run" and "when you're splittin' hairs with Mr. Clean, it's like gettin' head from a guillotine, and the night has just begun."  The chorus is a refrain of "talk is cheap, shut up and dance; don't get deep, shut up and dance."

References

Aerosmith songs
1993 songs
1994 singles
Geffen Records singles
Glam metal songs
Song recordings produced by Bruce Fairbairn
Songs written by Jack Blades
Songs written by Joe Perry (musician)
Songs written by Steven Tyler
Songs written by Tommy Shaw